Pervomaisc is a community in Căușeni District, Moldova. It is composed of two villages, Constantinovca and Pervomaisc.

References

Communes of Căușeni District